Mirali Sharipov (born 30 October 1987) is an Uzbekistani judoka, who played for the half-lightweight category. He is a two-time World Cup champion and a bronze medalist at the 2008 Asian Judo Championships in Jeju City, South Korea.

Sharipov represented Uzbekistan at the 2008 Summer Olympics in Beijing, where he competed for the men's half-lightweight class (66 kg). He defeated Spain's Óscar Peñas and Algeria's Mounir Benamadi in the preliminary rounds, before losing out the quarterfinal match, by a waza-ari awasete ippon (two points), to Japan's Masato Uchishiba. Because his opponent advanced further into the final match, Sharipov offered another shot for the bronze medal by defeating Iran's Arash Miresmaeili, and Egypt's Aheen El Hady in the repechage rounds. He finished only in fifth place, after losing out the bronze medal match to North Korea's Pak Chol-Min, who successfully scored a waza-ari awasete ippon and a kesa-gatame (scarf hold), one second before the five-minute period had ended.

References

External links
 
 
 NBC Olympics Profile

Uzbekistani male judoka
Living people
Olympic judoka of Uzbekistan
Judoka at the 2008 Summer Olympics
Judoka at the 2016 Summer Olympics
1987 births
Judoka at the 2006 Asian Games
Ju-jitsu practitioners at the 2018 Asian Games
Asian Games competitors for Uzbekistan
20th-century Uzbekistani people
21st-century Uzbekistani people